The Rally of Democratic Forces of Guinea (French: Rassemblement des forces démocratiques de Guinée) was a minor Guinean rebel group.
This group was represented in the media by a man identifying as Mohamed Lamine Fofana, but whose identity was questionable.

The RFDG launched a series of attacks against Guinean government forces from its base located in Liberia on September 11, 2000.  The Guinean state forces launched a counteroffensive against the RFDG and Liberian forces on September 22.  Heavy fighting lasted through March 2001.  An ECOWAS meeting in April 2001 was able to prevent this conflict from escalating into a full-scale war between Guinea and Liberia, and was able to end the civil war between RFDG and the Guinean state.

References

Conflicts in 2000
Civil wars involving the states and peoples of Africa
Civil wars post-1945
Wars involving Liberia
2000 in Liberia
2001 in Liberia